Mohammad Ali Falahatinejad (15 July 1976, Tehran – 14 August 2017, Tehran) was an Iranian weightlifter who won the gold medal in the Men's 77 kg weight class at the 2003 World Weightlifting Championships.

Major results

References 
 www.gz2010.cn 

Specific

External links
 
 

1976 births
2017 deaths
World Weightlifting Championships medalists
Iranian male weightlifters
Iranian strength athletes
Asian Games bronze medalists for Iran
Sportspeople from Tehran
Asian Games medalists in weightlifting
Weightlifters at the 2002 Asian Games
Medalists at the 2002 Asian Games
Deaths from kidney failure
20th-century Iranian people
21st-century Iranian people